احسان عیسوند سلطان

﮼احسان عیسوند

References 

Populated places in Dashtestan County